Lim Boon Heng (born 18 November 1947) is a Singaporean former politician. A former member of the governing People's Action Party (PAP), he was a Member of Parliament (MP) between 1980 and 2011, and had served in the Cabinet between 2001 and 2011. He also served as Chairman of the People's Action Party between 2004 and 2011.

Lim had also served as Chairman of NTUC Enterprise Co-operative, Deputy Chairman of the Singapore Labour Foundation, Secretary-General of the National Trades Union Congress (NTUC) and Deputy Chairman of the People's Association.

Since retiring from politics, Lim has been serving as the chairman of Temasek Holdings since 2013.

Early life 
Lim grew up in a small farm in Punggol, Singapore. He studied at Montfort Junior School (1955–1960) and Montfort Secondary School (1961–1966). In 1967, Lim was awarded a Colombo Plan Scholarship to study naval architecture at the University of Newcastle-upon-Tyne. Upon graduation in 1970, he joined Neptune Orient Lines (NOL) as a naval architect. In 1971, he was awarded a one-year NORAD (Norwegian) Fellowship for practical training in Oslo, leading to a diploma in international shipping inspection. Lim was assigned overseas twice to supervise the construction of NOL's new ships - Denmark (1972–1974) and Japan (1976–1977). He was promoted to Manager of Corporate Planning in 1978, while concurrently holding the post of Manager of Liner Services.

Political career
Lim entered politics in 1980 after he was approached by Goh Chok Tong, who had previously worked with him in NOL. Lim was elected a Member of Parliament (MP) for Kebun Baru (1980–1991). Lim floated the concept of town councils in 1984 and became the Chairman of the first town council in Ang Mo Kio West in 1986. He was MP for the Ulu Pandan (1991–2001) and Jurong (Jurong Central) (2001–2011). Lim was Chairman of the Government Parliamentary Committee (GPC) for Labour (1987–1991) and Deputy Speaker of Parliament (1989–1991).

Lim first entered the Cabinet when he was appointed as Minister without portfolio in October 1993 (later renamed as Minister in the Prime Minister's Office). Before being elevated to the Cabinet, he was appointed Senior Minister of State for the Ministry of Trade and Industry in 1991 and later became the Second Minister in 1993. In 1996, he was the Treasurer of the PAP Central Executive Committee and went on to become the Chairman of the PAP Central Executive Committee in 2004. In 2007, Lim was appointed Chairman of the Ministerial Committee on Ageing to oversee issues related to Singapore's rapidly ageing population.

Lim was Chairman of the National Productivity Board (1991–2003), later known as the Productivity and Standards Board and subsequently the Standards, Productivity and Innovation Board (SPRING Singapore). Lim was also Chairman of the Skills Development Council (1999–2002).

Lim was the Chairman of the Cost Review Committee to look into cost of living in Singapore. (CRC1993 and CRC1996).

Lim announced his retirement from politics in 2011 before the general elections. He also hit the headlines in when he teared up while responding to the media on whether there was groupthink among PAP politicians. He recounts how the Cabinet was deeply split over whether to set up a casino in Singapore and his struggle with the decision.

Trade union career 
Lim has a long career with the trade union in Singapore. He spent 26 years at the National Trades Union Congress, with the last 13 as its Secretary-General. He rose from the position of Deputy Director (1981–1983) to Assistant Secretary-General (1983–1987) and Deputy Secretary-General (1987–1991). Thereafter, he had a two-year stint at the Ministry of Trade and Industry (1991–1993). Upon his return to the NTUC, he was elected Secretary-General and served for another four terms until he stepped down in December 2006 to make way for Lim Swee Say.

Lim is Chairman of NTUC Eldercare since 2000 and Deputy Chairman of Singapore Labour Foundation since 1997. Following his retirement from NTUC, Lim helps to oversee the labour movement's network of nine cooperatives. He is currently Chairman of the Social Enterprises Development Council.

Lim served as a member on the National Wages Council from 1981 to 1991. Lim was instrumental in pushing for a flexible wage system to help older workers keep their jobs and to preserve jobs during difficult economic times.

Lim was able to persuade union leaders to support the Central Provident Fund (CPF) cuts and reform during the 1998 recession. He also rallied union leaders and workers to support the restructuring of key companies like PSA International and Singapore Airlines (SIA).

Aware of the many criticisms of his wearing the two hats - that of NTUC chief and Minister in the Cabinet, Lim argued that this arrangement gave labour a place to influence public policy-making at the highest level. He opined that both trade unions and government have the same objective - to better the lives of workers.

In August 1996, Lim was conferred the honorary Doctor of Business from the Royal Melbourne Institute of Technology for his role in developing and fostering tripartite relationship among government, employers and workers in Singapore. In November 1996, Lim received the honorary Doctorate of Civil Law from his alma mater, the University of Newcastle Upon Tyne for his "combined academic distinction, business acumen, political commitment and social concern". In 2007, the NTUC honoured Lim with the Distinguished Comrade of Labour for his contributions to the trade union movement. The NTUC recognises Lim as having played a key role in building trust among tripartite partners in the tumultuous 1990s when Singapore was rocked by recessions, job losses, and economic restructuring.

Lim was also the Executive Secretary of SMMWU (1981–1991) and advisor to 11 unions affiliated to the NTUC. He was also Chairman of NTUC Pasir Ris Resort Management Committee (1988–1992), Chairman of NTUC Club (1993–2006) and Appointing Governor of the Ong Teng Cheong Institute of Labour Studies (OTC-ILS) (1993–2006).

In 2013, the Lim Boon Heng Scholarship was launched to help Singaporean students who are residents of Jurong Central and Jurong Spring constituencies who have applied for admission into or are pursuing higher education in Singapore universities.

Post-politics career 
After Lim's retirement from politics in 2011, he joined Temasek Holding's as a director in June 2012. In July 2013, the investment company announced his appointment as chairman to replace the then outgoing chairman S. Dhanabalan.

Lim is also the chairman of NTUC Enterprise Co-operative. and retains his position as deputy chairman of the Singapore Labour Foundation.

In 2017, Lim urged Singaporeans to work as long as they can, as working longer can offer health benefits and give them a sense of purpose. "We should work for as long as we are able to work, and want to work, although we should not expect the same pay."

In 2018, Lim participated in a roundtable to discuss about the merits of the Progressive Wage Model in Singapore versus a universal Minimum Wage.

References

Members of the Cabinet of Singapore
Members of the Parliament of Singapore
People's Action Party politicians
Singaporean people of Teochew descent
Living people
1947 births
Singaporean trade unionists